Singhpura is a town in the Punjab, Pakistan named after the Singhpura Misl.

Villages in Punjab, Pakistan